Mawarid Holding is a private Saudi investment company. It was established in 1968. Its headquarters are in Suleimania, Riyadh. It manages and controls investments in diversified businesses in financial services, telecommunications, satellite television and radio network, construction, general distribution and trading, catering and restaurants.

Major investments
 Arabian Inspection and Survey
 Carton Products Company	
 Eastern Catering
 Mawarid Construction Company
 Mawarid Electronics	
 Mawarid International Company
 Mawarid Marketing Company
 Medical Equipment and Supplies
 Madeed properties
 Mawarid Overseas Company
 Iridium Africa Company
 MEED Trading Company
 MEED Trading Company - (220+ C-Stores)
 MEED Express - First Vending Operator in Saudi
 Mawarid Food Company
 Saudi Agricultural Development Company
 Mawarid Gida Ticaret A.S.
 Mawarid Services
 Mawarid Services Company	
 Mawarid Trading Company (Saudi)
 Mawarid Trading Kuwait
 Mawarid Trading Qatar
 Mawarid Trading UAE
 Mawarid Trading Oman
 Mawarid Trading Lebanon
 Mawarid Trading Bahrain
 Mawarid Investments Company
 Raytheon Saudi Arabia
 Digital Media Systems [DMS]
 Orbit Communications Company (formerly)
 OSN (39.5% stake)
 Digital Technology Systems
 International Production and Distribution Services
 Amex (Middle East)
 Saudi Chemical Company
 Saudi Arabian Amiantit Company
 Arab Commercial Enterprises
 Bayn Consortium
 Integrated Telecom Company
 Mawarid Marocaine
 Petro-Hunt Middle East
 Saudi Polyester Products
 Digital Transformation
 Advanced Technology Solutions (ATSS)
 Interactive Smart Communications (ISC)
 Interactive Smart Financials (ISF)

References

External links
 Mawarid Holding
 Salam Telecom
 Advanced Telecommunications Solutions & Services
 Interactive Smart Communications
 Interactive Smart Financials

1968 establishments in Saudi Arabia
Financial services companies established in 1968
Holding companies of Saudi Arabia
Companies based in Riyadh
Privately held companies